Sara Gross (born March 26, 1976 in Sarnia, Ontario) is a former professional triathlete, who was born in Canada but competed for Great Britain. She grew up in Kitchener, Ontario and Dubai, United Arab Emirates. In 2005, she won the ITU European Long Distance Triathlon (4 km swimming, 120 km road cycling, 30 km running) in Säter, Sweden. In 2014, she won two Ironman Triathlon events; Ironman Brazil and Ironman Mont-Tremblant. Gross retired from professional triathlon in 2016 and now focuses on her media career.

Gross attended Dollar Academy in Scotland for high school. She went on to attend Queen's University in Ontario, Canada where she obtained her bachelor's and master's degree. In June 2006, she graduated from University of Edinburgh earning a PhD in ancient history and religion with her dissertation focusing on women's history. It was during this time in Edinburgh that she took up the sport of triathlon.

In 2014, Gross, co-founded and is currently President of TriEqual, a NGO whose mission is to promote fairness, development and equality for women in the sport of triathlon

Gross also co-founded Mercury Rising Triathlon, with Carrie Herman. MRT is a performance-based club in Victoria, British Columbia. where she works as a triathlon coach.

Gross is a member of the Bahrain Endurance Team, a professional triathlon team sponsored by His Highness Sheikh Nasser bin Hamad al Khalifa.

Gross is also a Presenter, Senior Producer and Chief Writer at WiSP Sports - The Global Women's Sports Network.

References

External links
 

1976 births
British female triathletes
Living people
Sportspeople from Sarnia
People educated at Dollar Academy
Queen's University at Kingston alumni
Alumni of the University of Edinburgh